Defaulting on a loan happens when repayments are not made for a certain period of time as defined in the loan's terms of agreement, typically a promissory note. For federal student loans, default requires non-payment for a period of 270 days. For private student loans, default generally occurs after 120 days of non-payment.

In 2021, outstanding student loan debt has reached a record more than $1.8 trillion. Outstanding student loan debt has increased from $1.06T to 1.41T from 2014 to 2019, a 33% increase. The average loan balance per borrower has reached over $35,000. Of that amount, 10.8% of that student debt is at least 90 days past due or in default. This is not limited to a small population; analysis has shown that every year at least 1 million individual borrowers enter default on their student loans. Many analysts consider the number of individual borrowers that are at risk of default to be undercounted due to the prevalence of borrowers in deferment, forbearance, grace periods.

Defaulter demographics

According to analysis of borrowers from the 2003-2004 academic year over a twelve-year period, defaulters generally tend to be older, lower income, and more financially independent than those who did not default. Borrowers typically owe $9,625, which is $8,500 less than the median loan balance of a non-defaulter. The majority of defaulters did not complete their bachelor's degree, but the median completed at least one year of study while maintaining grades in the C+/B- range. This shows that defaulters are able to complete college level work. Furthermore, most borrowers do not immediately enter default - the median borrower takes 33 months to enter default on their federal loans. Generally, a little more than half of all defaulters are able to rehabilitate their debt.

Debt rehabilitation

There are a number of paths to resolving student debt default, including:

 Completing 10 months of agreed upon payments
 Repayment via debt consolidation or other types of loans
 Discharge via total and permanent disability
 Discharge via bankruptcy

See also
Bankruptcy Abuse Prevention and Consumer Protection Act
Cohort Default Rate
Default (finance)
Garnishment
Higher Education Act of 1965
Loan
Student loans in the United States

References

Student loans in the United States